Girard Township (S½ T12N R6W) is located in Macoupin County, Illinois, United States. As of the 2010 census, its population was 2,466 and it contained 1,102 housing units.

History
Girard Township is named for Stephen Girard.

Geography

Demographics

Adjacent townships
 Virden Township (north)
 Bois D'Arc Township, Montgomery County (east)
 Pitman Township, Montgomery County (southeast)
 Nilwood Township (south)
 South Otter Township (southwest)
 North Otter Township (west)

References

External links
City-data.com
Illinois State Archives

Townships in Macoupin County, Illinois
Townships in Illinois